The 2010 Taça de Angola was the 29th edition of the Taça de Angola, the second most important and the top knock-out football club competition in Angola, following the Girabola. Atlético Sport Aviação beat G.D. Interclube 4–3 in a penalty shoot-out after a scoreless draw in regular time, to secure its 3rd title.

The winner qualified to the 2011 CAF Confederation Cup.

Stadia and locations

Championship bracket

Preliminary rounds

Round of 16

Quarter-finals

Semi-finals

Final

See also
 2010 Girabola
 2011 Angola Super Cup
 2011 CAF Confederation Cup
 ASA players
 Interclube players

External links
 Tournament profile at girabola.com
 Tournament profile at rsssf.com

References

Angola Cup
Taca de Angola
Taca de Angola